USS Tide (SP-953) was a minesweeper in the United States Navy.

Tide was a tug built in 1916 at Manitowoc, Wisconsin, by the Manitowoc Shipbuilding Co. — was acquired by the U.S. Navy on 14 June 1918 from the Bay State Fishing Co., of Boston, Massachusetts, to serve as a minesweeper in the 1st Naval District.

Military service
Though never commissioned by the U.S. Navy, she may have been armed and manned by naval reservists to patrol the waters of the 1st Naval District during the closing months of World War I.

Deactivation
In any event, her name was struck from the Navy List sometime between November 1918 and October 1919.

References

External links
 Photo gallery at navsource.org

Ships built in Manitowoc, Wisconsin
Minesweepers of the United States Navy
1916 ships
World War I minesweepers of the United States